Bull Creek may refer to:

Communities
In Australia
Bull Creek, Western Australia, suburb of Perth

In New Zealand
Glenledi, New Zealand, also known as Bull Creek

In the United States
Bull Creek, California, community in Humboldt County
Bull Creek, Florida, community in Osceola County
Bull Creek, Missouri, village in Taney County
Waverly, West Virginia, also known as Bull Creek

Streams
In Australia
 Bull Creek (Mitchell River), a tributary of the Mitchell River in Victoria
 Bull Creek (Murrindindi River), a tributary of the Murrindindi River in Victoria
 Bull Creek (New South Wales), a tributary of the Thredbo River in New South Wales

In the United States
Bull Creek (Humboldt County), a tributary of the Eel River in California
Bull Creek (Los Angeles County), a tributary of the Los Angeles River in California
Bull Creek (Georgia), in Evans County
Bull Creek (Lake Taneycomo), a stream in Missouri
Bull Creek (Animas Creek), in Hidalgo County, New Mexico
Bull Creek (Ararat River tributary), a stream in Surry County, North Carolina
Bull Creek (Ohio), near Youngstown
Bull Creek (Allegheny River), a tributary of the Allegheny River in Pennsylvania
Little Bull Creek (Allegheny River), a tributary of the above
Bull Creek (Pennington County, South Dakota)
Bull Creek (Texas), a tributary of the Colorado River

Other
Bull Creek railway station, Perth, Western Australia
Goodnight, Bull Creek!, a 2009 album by Australian musician Bob Evans

See also